A sling is a drink historically made with sugar, hot or cold water, nutmeg, and a spirit such as gin, whiskey, rum, or brandy. In its modern form, it is made with gin and, varyingly, of ingredients such as sweet vermouth, lemon juice, simple syrup, Angostura bitters, and soda water. The word sling comes from the German schlingen, meaning "to swallow fast".

The Singapore Sling is a popular gin sling originally made at the Long Bar, Raffles Hotel, Singapore.  Recipes for it variously contain such ingreditents as Benedictine, cherry liqueur, herbal liqueur, pineapple juice, lime juice, bitters, and club soda.

History
The sling is an old drink, originally intended to be a single-serving punch, containing sour, sweet, and alcoholic ingredients in proportions that have varied with time. The introduction of bitters was a new twist added to some versions of the drink, creating a cocktail of spirit, sugar, water, and bitters, making a drink similar to an Old Fashioned.

References

External links
 Sling Cocktails | FOUR Magazine : FOUR Magazine

Cocktails with nutmeg
Cocktails with gin
Cocktails with sweet vermouth
Cocktails with lemonade
Cocktails with Angostura bitters
Cocktails with carbonated water